Harwell may refer to:

People
Harwell (surname)
Harwell Hamilton Harris (1903–1990), American architect

Places
Harwell, Nottinghamshire, England, a hamlet
Harwell, Oxfordshire, England, a village
RAF Harwell, a World War II RAF airfield, near Harwell village.
Harwell Science and Innovation Campus, the current official name of the former RAF Harwell site
Atomic Energy Research Establishment
Harwell Glacier, in Antarctica

Other uses
Harwell-Boeing file format

See also

Hartwell (disambiguation)